João Manuel Soares Moniz (born 7 April 1953) is a Portuguese former professional footballer who played as a forward.

Career 
Moniz began playing at the youth level in 1969 with S.C. Lusitânia, and the following season he joined Sporting CP. In 1972, he played with Lisboa's senior team in the Primeira Divisão. After two seasons with Sporting Lisboa he signed with Atlético CP. In 1975, he played in the Terceira Divisão with Sporting Clube Pombal for a season.

In 1976, he played abroad in the National Soccer League with Toronto First Portuguese. In 1979, he assisted First Portuguese in producing a perfect season. He played his final year with Toronto First Portuguese for the 1980 season. He played in the 1980 CNSL All-Star match where he recorded a goal.

Moniz would sign with league rivals Toronto Italia for the 1981 season. In 1982 he featured in the NSL Championship final against Hamilton Steelers. The following season he assisted Italia in securing the NSL Championship by contributing a goal against Dinamo Latino. He returned to Toronto First Portuguese for the 1987 season.

References  

1953 births
Living people
Portuguese footballers
Association football forwards
Sporting CP footballers
Atlético Clube de Portugal players
S.C. Pombal players
Toronto Italia players
Primeira Liga players
Canadian National Soccer League players
Toronto First Portuguese players
Portuguese expatriate footballers
Expatriate soccer players in Canada
Portuguese expatriate sportspeople in Canada